Marcos Abner Delgado Ocampo (born 17 February 1988) is a Peruvian footballer who plays for Ayacucho FC as a central midfielder.

Club career
Marcos Delgado joined Peruvian giants Sporting Cristal in 2006. He was promoted to the first team the following season.
Then later Delgado made his Torneo Descentralizado league debut on 26 August 2007 in an away match against Coronel Bolognesi. Manager Juan Carlos Oblitas put him in the 73rd minute to help wrap up the 0–1 win for Cristal. The following week he played his first match as a starter playing alongside Rainer Torres in the midfield in the 1–1 draw at home against Melgar.
He finished his debut season with 14 league appearances.

He then had a season long spell with Coronel Bolognesi, joining the Tacna club in January 2009. That season he played under the management of Roberto Mosquera for his first time.
He often partnered Erick Rojas in the midfield and made 29 league appearances for Bolognesi in the 2009 Descentralizado season.

Delgado then joined Colegio Nacional de Iquitos in January 2010. There he scored his first league goal of his career on matchday 2 in the 3–1 home win over Sport Boys. He finished the 2010 season with ten league appearances and one goal.

Honours

Club
Sporting Cristal
Torneo Descentralizado: 2012

References

External links

1988 births
Living people
People from Chiclayo
Association football midfielders
Peruvian footballers
Sporting Cristal footballers
Coronel Bolognesi footballers
Colegio Nacional Iquitos footballers
Sport Huancayo footballers
Real Garcilaso footballers
Juan Aurich footballers
Club Deportivo Universidad de San Martín de Porres players
Cusco FC footballers
Peruvian Primera División players